"Hotel Key" is a song recorded by American country music group Old Dominion. It was released in April 2018 as the third single from their 2017 album Happy Endings.

Content
"Hotel Key" is about a couple who has a one-night stand at a hotel, but does not forget their encounter after it is over. In particular, the female half of the couple keeps the hotel key as a memento after the encounter is over. Group members Matthew Ramsey and Trevor Rosen wrote the song with Josh Osborne.

The radio version changes the verse where Ramsey says "We were smoking a little, from a half an ounce," to "We were stuck in the middle, lovin’ every ounce."

Commercial performance
The song reached number one on the Country Airplay chart for charts dated September 29, 2018, becoming Old Dominion's fifth number one single, and the fourth consecutive number one, on that chart. The song has sold 105,000 copies in the United States as of October 2018.

Music video
The song's music video was directed by Jim Wright, and was filmed at the Safari Inn in Murfreesboro, Tennessee. It portrays a couple's encounter at a hotel, with Ramsey portraying a desk clerk.

Charts

Weekly charts

Year-end charts

Certifications

References

2017 songs
2018 singles
Songs written by Matthew Ramsey
Songs written by Trevor Rosen
Songs written by Josh Osborne
Old Dominion (band) songs
RCA Records Nashville singles
Song recordings produced by Shane McAnally
Songs about drugs
Songs about casual sex
Songs about hotels and motels